Professor Daniel J. Wigdor is a Professor of Computer Science at the University of Toronto. He was previously co-director of the university's Dynamic Graphics Project and a visiting associate professor at Cornell Tech. He has co-authored and contributed to several books, including "Brave NUI World" (2011), "The Human-Computer Interaction Handbook, Third Edition" (2011), and "Computer Science Handbook, Third Edition" (2014). 

Wigdor was awarded a prestigious Sloan Research Fellowship in 2015. 

His research is in the area of human-computer interaction, with major areas of focus in the architecture of highly-performant UI’s, in interaction and application models for mobile computing, in platform design for ubiquitous computing, and in post-WIMP interaction methods. Before joining the faculty at U of T in 2011, Daniel was a researcher at Microsoft Research, as well as the user experience architect of the Microsoft Surface Table and Microsoft’s Entertainment and Devices division. Daniel has served as a visiting associate professor at Cornell Tech (2017-2018), as an affiliate assistant professor at the University of Washington (2009-2011), and fellow and associate at Harvard University (2007-2008, 2011-2012). He conducted research as an intern at Mitsubishi Electric Research Labs (2005-2008).

Education 
Daniel Wigdor attended Uxbridge Secondary School in Uxbridge, Ontario. In 1998, he attended the University of Toronto - Innis College and graduated in 2002 with a bachelor of science in Human Computer Interaction (Computer Science) and then in 2004 with a Masters in Human Computer Interaction (Computer Science) as well. In 2007, he became a fellow at the Initiative for Innovative Computing at Harvard University's department of Computer Science - Human-Computer Interaction.

In 2008, he received his PhD in Computer Science (HCI) from the University of Toronto.

Early work 
While in the University of Toronto, Daniel Wigdor worked as a Teaching Assistant between 1999 and 2004, as well as an instructor between 2001 and 2006, teaching topics ranging from first to third year Intro to Programming, Advanced Algorithms and Data Structures, Topics in Computer Science, and Human Computer Interaction.

In 2002, Professor Wigdor co-founded Iota Wireless, a startup dedicated to the commercialization of his research in mobile-phone gestural interaction, where he held the role of Chief Technology Officer between 2002 and 2007.

He was also an intern at Mitsubishi Electric Research Labs between 2005 and 2008, where he conducted research as part of the DiamondSpace project. In 2008, he became a User Experience Architect, Researcher at Microsoft. While working at Microsoft Research, he was the user experience architect of the Microsoft Surface Table, as well as a company-wide expert in user interfaces for new technologies. At the same time, beginning in 2009, he served as an affiliate assistant professor in both the Department of Computer Science and Engineering and the Information School at the University of Washington.

He became an assistant professor at the University of Toronto in 2011, as well as a science advisor at Tactual Labs in 2012, both lasting until 2016, after which he became an associate professor at the University. He became a full professor in 2021.

References 

Living people
Year of birth missing (living people)
Canadian computer scientists
Academic staff of the University of Toronto
University of Toronto alumni